David Broucher (born 1944) is a former British diplomat. He served as British Ambassador to the Czech Republic between 1997 and 2001.

Hutton Inquiry
At the Hutton Inquiry Broucher reported a conversation with David Kelly at a Geneva  meeting in February 2003, which he described as from "deep within the memory hole". Broucher related that Kelly said he had assured his Iraqi sources that there would be no war if they co-operated, and that a war would put him in an 'ambiguous' moral position. Broucher had asked Kelly what would happen if Iraq were invaded, and Kelly had replied, 'I will probably be found dead in the woods.' Broucher then quoted from an email he had sent just after Kelly's death: 'I did not think much of this at the time, taking it to be a hint that the Iraqis might try to take revenge against him, something that did not seem at all fanciful then. I now see that he may have been thinking on rather different lines.'

References
  Ziarul Financiar, 31 mai 2005 - Președintele și-a luat consilieri străini
  Ziua, 31 mai 2005 - Consilieri britanici la Cotroceni 
  Cotidianul, 17 noiembrie 2006 - Băsescu mai are doar 2 consilieri personali din 4 

Living people
1944 births
Ambassadors of the United Kingdom to the Czech Republic